Bernadette Patricia Felicien (12 January 1967 – 27 February 1997) was a Saint Lucian cricketer who played as a right-handed batter and right-arm pace bowler. She appeared in five One Day Internationals for the West Indies, all at the 1993 World Cup in England. She played domestic cricket for Saint Lucia.

Felicien played in five of her team's seven matches at the World Cup, making her debut in the third match of the tournament, against Australia. She and Eugena Gregg were the only Saint Lucians in the squad, and the first Saint Lucians to be selected in any West Indies squad. Felicien was given little game time, batting in the lower order and bowling only 15 overs, without taking a wicket. Against New Zealand, she was out leg before wicket to Julie Harris for a golden duck, giving Harris her hat-trick. Felicien died in a motor vehicle accident on 27 February 1997, at the age of 29. Her aunt, Verena Felicien, later captained the West Indies.

References

External links
 
 

1967 births
1997 deaths
West Indian women cricketers
West Indies women One Day International cricketers
Saint Lucian women cricketers
Road incident deaths in Saint Lucia